War and Washington was a song written during the American Revolution by Jonathan M. Sewall.  To be sung to the tune of The British Grenadiers the verses are:

References

18th-century songs
Songs of the American Revolutionary War
American patriotic songs